Fred B. Breitwisch was a member of the Wisconsin State Assembly.

Biography
Breitwisch was born on January 11, 1867, in Milwaukee, Wisconsin.

Career
Breitwisch was elected to the Assembly in 1902. He was a Republican.

See also
The Political Graveyard

References

Politicians from Milwaukee
Republican Party members of the Wisconsin State Assembly
1867 births
Year of death missing